The Gewehr-Panzergranate was a shaped charge rifle grenade that was developed by Germany and used by the Wehrmacht during World War II.

Design 

The Gewehr-Panzergranate was launched from a Gewehrgranatengerät or Schiessbecher ("shooting cup") on a standard service rifle by a blank cartridge.  The primary components were a nose cap, internal steel cone, steel upper body, aluminum lower body, rifled driving band, TNT filling, and a PETN base fuze.  

The Gewehr-Panzergranate was an anti-armor weapon which upon hitting the target ignited the PETN base fuze which in turn ignited the TNT filling which collapsed the internal steel cone to create a superplastic high-velocity jet to punch through enemy armor.  Since shaped charge weapons rely on chemical energy to penetrate enemy armor the low velocity of the grenade did not adversely affect penetration.  A downside of the Gewehr-Panzergranate was its short range .

References

Grenades of Germany
Rifle grenades
World War II weapons of Germany